This could refer to 
 Li Shizeng, born as Li Yuying
 Yuying Li, also spelled Li Yuying